Sinués is a locality located in the municipality of Aísa, in Huesca province, Aragon, Spain. As of 2020, it has a population of 55.

Geography 
Sinués is located 94km north-northwest of Huesca.

References

Populated places in the Province of Huesca